Brendan Shanahan (born 1979) is an Australian journalist and author. Shanahan was born in Sydney, but grew up in Canberra, the Australian capital. He has an honours degree in Art History and Curatorship from the Australian National University in Canberra. While at university, Shanahan was the editor of the ANU Student Newspaper, Woroni.  He is the author of 2008's In Turkey I Am Beautiful, a memoir of his travels in Turkey, and  The Secret Life of the Gold Coast.

Notes

External links
 brendanshanahan.net: Official Website
 In Turkey I Am Beautiful: Official Website
 Extract of The Secret Life of the Gold Coast Penguin Group (Australia) (Retrieved 14 September 2007)

1976 births
Living people
Australian columnists
Australian journalists
Australian National University alumni